Enga Ooru Aattukkaran is a 1990 Indian Tamil-language film directed by Sripriya, starring her brother Chandrakanth as the protagonist and herself as the antagonist. It was released on 11 August 1990.

Plot 

A villager and a rich man's educated daughter clash with each other after the former is insulted by the latter, but both eventually fall in love.

Cast 
Chandrakanth as the villager
Sripriya as the village playboy's concubine
Kanaka as the rich man's educated daughter
Rajeev as the village playboy

Reception 
N. Krishnaswamy of The Indian Express criticised the film's concept of giving importance to the goat and having it have a flashback scene while also criticising the film's camerawork and music.

References

External links 
 

1990s Tamil-language films
Films directed by Sripriya